Ossulstone is an obsolete subdivision (hundred) covering 26.4% of – and the most metropolitan part – of the historic county of Middlesex, England. It surrounded but did not include the City of London and the area has been entirely absorbed by the growth of London. It now corresponds to the seven London Boroughs of Inner London north of the Thames and, from Outer London, in decreasing order, certain historic parishes of the London boroughs of Ealing, Brent, Barnet, and Haringey.

History
It was named after "Oswald's Stone" or "Oswulf's Stone", an unmarked minor pre-Roman monolith which stood at Tyburn (the modern-day junction of the Edgware Road with Bayswater Road). Oswald's Stone was earthed over in 1819, but dug up three years later because of its presumed historical significance. Later in the 19th century it was to be found leaning against Marble Arch. In 1869, shortly after an archaeological journal published an article about the stone, it disappeared and it has not been found since.

Originally meeting at Oswald's Stone, the hundred court eventually moved south-east to the vicinity of Holborn, where by the 19th century it was being held in a building in the north east corner of Red Lion Square, by that stage an outpost of the legal quarter of London close to Lincoln's Inn. Following the de facto end of hundreds as a judicial unit in the late 19th century, the building became the headquarters of Conway Hall Ethical Society.

It was always the largest of the six hundreds of Middlesex, and from early medieval times it had more than 20 parishes and some of the most complicated ecclesiastical units and liberties in the country, as there were many medieval foundations outside of London's walls.
 
Parishes 
Taking New Brentford as part of Brentford Ossulstone had fourteen land-border parishes — one, St Pancras, only as to a far corner in Highgate. 

Borders clockwise
Ealing bordered three parishes of Elthorne to the west. Six parishes (from a little of Ealing to a corner of St Pancras in Highgate) bordered three parishes of Gore hundred to the north-west. Then, proceeding clockwise, an arm of Finchley and the strip parish of Friern Barnet formed a single counter-salient into the small parishes in and around Chipping Barnet in Hertfordshire, these being the only great salient into Middlesex's shape. Hornsey, Stoke Newington and Hackney in the hundred's northeast bounded Tottenham parish in Edmonton hundred (sometimes called a half-hundred). Four parishes starting with Hackney bordered the Becontree hundred of Essex to the east. Finally two of these land-border parishes and many others had the Thames as their southern limit. Beyond the tidal Thames lay the Blackheath Hundred of Kent to the southeast and those of Lambeth, Brixton and Kingston in Surrey. Until Westminster and Putney Bridges were built in the 18th century the bridge to cross the Thames below Kingston was London Bridge. Ossulstone however omitted the City of London in which lay that bridge, as it surrounded the compact city to the west, north and east. Westminster for many purposes formed a "liberty", meaning it enjoyed its own customs as to markets, and freedoms from wider royal precepts and hundred courts.

Battles
The very edges of the Hundred were militarily strategic and included the sites of all three of Middlesex's known, notable battles:
The Battle of Brentford (1016) was a minor victory of Edmund II of England ("Ironside") against the Danes.
Towards the end of the Wars of the Roses, the Battle of Barnet in 1471, together with the Battle of Tewkesbury in Gloucestershire the next month, restored Edward IV of England to the throne.
The Battle of Brentford (1642) was a minor pitched battle and royalist victory of commander Prince Rupert. It was less than three weeks after the partial success and larger Battle of Edgehill in Warwickshire. The resultant standoff and retreat to Oxford for the winter was dubbed the Battle of Turnham Green in the next parish of Chiswick in Ossulstone.

Divisions
In the 17th century the hundred was split into five divisions, which had their own hundred courts and so assumed the remnant administrative purposes of the Hundred. The Tower Division (also known as Tower Hamlets) had significant further responsibilities, as by having its own lord-lieutenant it took on military responsibilities normally exercised at county level. The five divisions of Ossulstone were:

Notes and references
Notes

References

External links
Vision of Britain - Ossulstone hundred
Map of Divisions of Ossulstone Hundred – the map indicates that technically the Westminster Division was an independent constituent of the Holborn Division.

Hundreds and divisions of Middlesex
History of the London Borough of Tower Hamlets
History of the London Borough of Hackney
History of the London Borough of Islington
History of the London Borough of Haringey
History of the London Borough of Enfield
History of the London Borough of Barnet
History of the London Borough of Brent
History of the London Borough of Hounslow
History of the City of Westminster
History of the London Borough of Ealing
History of local government in London (pre-1855)